Tomasz Karasiński (born 25 November 1973) is a Polish former footballer. He was in the broad squad of Stal Stalowa Wola when they played in the Ekstraklasa (without his debut). On 13 October 1999, he made his Polish Cup debut, as he played the entire game for Tłoki Gorzyce against KS Myszków.

In the past, he was the top scorer of the III liga (then the third tier), as a footballer in Tłoki Gorzyce.

References

External links
 

1973 births
Living people
Polish footballers
Association football midfielders
Stal Stalowa Wola players
II liga players